Coppa delle Alpi (translated as Cup of the Alps) was a friendly football tournament, first organized by the Italian national league as it started in 1960 and then they were aided by the Swiss League from 1962, for the reason that the majority of the Alps are in Switzerland. This competition ran from 1960 until 1987.

In the 1960s and 1961 editions ranking was compiled by adding the points of the Italian and Swiss teams. The tournament was won by the Italian federation in both editions, and the teams that represented it was given a cup of reduced dimensions (A.S. Roma, Catania Calcio, Hellas Verona F.C., Catanzaro Calcio, Triestina, U.S. Città di Palermo, Napoli Calcio and Alessandria Calcio in the 1960 and S.S. Lazio, Fiorentina, A.C. Monza Brianza 1912, Pro Patria Calcio, A.C. Reggiana 1919, Parma F.C., Lecco Calcio and Brescia Calcio in the 1961).

Years

 1960-61: competition between league selections and Italian and Swiss teams.
 1962-66: competition between  Italian and  Swiss teams.
 1967-68: competition between  German,  Italian and  Swiss teams.
 1969-71: competition between  Italian and  Swiss teams.
 1972-87: competition between  French and  Swiss teams.

List of finals

Performance

By club

A victory as a member of the Italian selection: A.S. Roma, Catania Calcio, Hellas Verona F.C., Catanzaro Calcio, Triestina, U.S. Città di Palermo, Napoli Calcio, Alessandria Calcio, S.S. Lazio, Fiorentina, A.C. Monza Brianza 1912, Pro Patria Calcio, A.C. Reggiana 1919, Parma F.C., Lecco Calcio Brescia Calcio.

By nation

Cup of the Alps for amateurs
In 1998 the competition was restarted (using the same name) but with amateur teams from Italy, Switzerland, France (and Belgium in 2004 and 2005). Each year in Geneva there is an unofficial tournament with 8 teams each with 15 amateurs played for the first place.

Dates
 1998: competition restart with amateur clubs between  Italian,  French and  Swiss teams.
 2004-05: a team from Belgium joined the competition.

Sources and References 
 Cup of the Alps at Rec.Sport.Soccer Statistics Foundation.

 
French football friendly trophies
German football friendly trophies
Defunct Italian football friendly trophies
Swiss football friendly trophies
Defunct international club association football competitions in Europe